Hopkins Township is a township in Nodaway County, in the U.S. state of Missouri.

Hopkins Township most likely took its name from the community of Hopkins, Missouri.

References

Townships in Missouri
Townships in Nodaway County, Missouri